Hari Puttar is a 2008 Indian comedy film directed by Lucky Kohli & Rajesh Bajaj. The film features Sarika, Zain Khan, Swini Khara, Saurabh Shukla, Vijay Raaz, Jackie Shroff and Lilette Dubey. It was released on 26 September 2008.

Plot
The film revolves around a ten-year-old boy, Hari Prasad Dhoonda (nicknamed Hari Puttar), who has recently moved from India to the United Kingdom. Left home alone with his cousin Tuk Tuk when his parents go on vacation, Hari must deal with two burglars who hope to steal a secret formula Hari's father had created.

Cast
 Zain Khan as Hari Prasad Dhoonda aka Hari Puttar
 Swini Khara as Tuk Tuk

Soundtrack
The soundtrack for Hari Puttar features songs composed by Aadesh Shrivastav with lyrics by Sameer:

"Hari Puttar" - Shaan, Aadesh Shrivastava & Neha Bhasin
"Tutari" - Sukhwinder Singh & Sunidhi Chauhan
"Bhai Ae Gaya" - Akriti Kakkar & Vicky Chandra
"Meri Yaadon Mein Hai Tu" - Shreya Ghoshal
"Hari Hari Puttar Hai" - Hamza Faruqui, Zain Khan & Sonia
"Hari Puttar is a Dude" - Aishwarya Majmudar & Sameer

Controversy
Warner Bros. filed a lawsuit against production company Mirchi Movies to stop the release of the film due to the similarity of its title to that of the Harry Potter series. An Indian court threw out the case on the basis that the public would be able to differentiate between the two titles, and that Warner had chosen to wait three years until the film's release to file their case.

Mirchi Movies CEO Munish Purii has insisted that there is very little similarity between Hari Puttar and any elements in the Harry Potter franchise, and explained that Hari is a popular Indian name, while "puttar" means "son" in the Punjabi language.

References

External links

2008 films
2008 comedy films
Films scored by Aadesh Shrivastava
2000s Hindi-language films
Indian remakes of American films
Warner Bros. films
Hindi remakes of English films